José Vicente Toribio Alcolea (born 22 December 1985 in Socuéllamos) is a Spanish cyclist, who currently rides for UCI Continental team . He has ridden in 3 editions of the Vuelta a España.

Major results

2005
 9th Gran Premio Área Metropolitana de Vigo
2008
 4th Overall Vuelta a Navarra
2009
 1st Overall Volta a Coruña
1st Stage 3
2011
 1st Stage 4 Volta a Portugal
2012
 6th Overall Vuelta a Castilla y León
 8th Vuelta a La Rioja
2013
 1st  Overall Tour de East Java
1st  Mountains classification
1st Stage 2
 2nd Tour de Okinawa
 5th Overall Tour de Hokkaido
 7th Overall Tour de Kumano
2014
 2nd Overall Tour de Kumano
 2nd Tour de Okinawa
 4th Overall Tour of Japan
2015
 4th Overall Tour de Hokkaido
 5th Overall Tour de Kumano
 7th Tour de Okinawa
2016
 4th Overall Tour de Kumano
2017
 1st  Overall Tour de Kumano
 3rd Overall Tour de Hokkaido
 4th Overall Tour of Japan
 4th Overall Tour de Tochigi
 10th Tour de Okinawa
2018
 7th Overall Tour de Kumano
 8th Overall Tour of Japan
2019
 3rd Overall Tour of Japan
 4th Overall Tour de Hokkaido
 7th Overall Tour de Tochigi
 10th Overall Tour de Kumano
2021
 8th Overall Tour of Japan
1st Stage 2
2022
 3rd Tour de Okinawa
 4th Oita Urban Classic
 5th Overall Tour de Kumano
 9th Overall Tour de Hokkaido

Grand Tour general classification results timeline

References

External links

1985 births
Living people
Spanish male cyclists
Sportspeople from the Province of Ciudad Real
Cyclists from Castilla-La Mancha